A bardic name is a pseudonym used in Wales, Cornwall, or Brittany by poets and other artists, especially those involved in the eisteddfod movement.

The Welsh term bardd ("poet") originally referred to the Welsh poets of the Middle Ages, who might be itinerant or attached to a noble household. Some of these medieval poets were known by a pseudonym, for example Cynddelw Brydydd Mawr ("Cynddelw the Master Poet"), fl. 1155–1200 and Iolo Goch ("Iolo the Red"), c. 1320 – c. 1398. The practice seems to have very ancient antecedents, as in the names of the presumably 6th century poets Talhaearn Tad Awen, Blwchfardd and Culfardd, mentioned by the Welsh historian Nennius alongside Taliesin and Aneirin, the last referred to as Aneurin Gwenithwawd ("Aneurin of the Corn Poetry").

The revival of bardic names became something of a conceit following the reinvention of medieval tradition by Iolo Morganwg in the 18th century. The usage has also extended to Breton and Cornish poetry. In Cornwall, some of the pioneers of the Cornish language movement are referred to by their bardic names, e.g. "Mordon" for Robert Morton Nance, and "Talek" for E. G. Retallack Hooper.

Many surnames in Wales derive from patronymics rather than, for instance, places of origin. Many people therefore share a limited number of surnames, and many people can share even the full name, so it was common practice to add a nickname to distinguish between people with similar names. For some people, this might be a reference to their occupation within the village, but for those with a literary reputation, whose name would be known across the land, it was common practice to take, or be awarded, a sobriquet.

For example, John Jones (Talhaiarn) took his bardic name from his place of origin, to distinguish him from contemporaries with the name John Jones. The minister Joseph Harris (Gomer) selected his bardic name from the Bible. Others, such as Hedd Wyn, used poetic inventions.

The name could be a pen name but it could also be an accolade. A bardic name, in the context of the eisteddfod, is a particular accolade, as it is adopted when inducted into the Orders of distinguished bards and writers.

The sobriquet could be:
 added to the surname, as in William Williams Pantycelyn – as a suffixed accolade.
 placed instead of the original surname, as in: William Pantycelyn – to preserve a distinction between the literary persona and the private persona. Although it is not an exact parallel, one writer had a personal life as the Lady Mallowan but continued to write murder-mysteries as (Dame) Agatha Christie and wrote non-fiction as Agatha Christie Mallowan.
 stand alone, as in: Pantycelyn – in the same way that the literary name of John le Carré is widely recognised without further elaboration, possibly better known than the writer's real name of David Cornwell.

See also

 Gorseth Kernow
 List of Welsh-language poets (6th century to c. 1600)

References

Welsh poetry
Pseudonymous writers
Arts in Wales
Welsh-language literature
Cornish culture
Breton language
Cornish language
Gorseddau
Eisteddfod